Marlon Uchiyama Evans (born 3 August 1997) is a Guamanian international footballer. He previously played for Wings F.C. in the Guam Men's Soccer League, Detroit City FC, and captained the North Greenville Crusaders.

Career
Beginning in 2013, Evans played for Guam Men's Soccer League club Wings F.C.

International
He made his first appearance for the Guam national football team in 2014.

References

1997 births
Living people
Guamanian footballers
Guam international footballers
Association football midfielders
Guamanian people of Japanese descent
Detroit City FC players
North Greenville Crusaders men's soccer players